The Council of State, is the supreme consultative council of the Spanish Government. The current Council of State was established in 1980 according to the article 107 of the Constitution of 1978. The institution of the Council of State, understood as supreme consultative council of the Government, has existed intermittently since 1812. During the Ancien Régime, the Council of State advised the King about foreign policy.

History
The council as the body through which the monarchs ruled their territories has its origins in the Crown of Castile with the creation of the Council of Castile in 1385 by King John II. Other peninsular kingdoms like Navarre also created its own council in 1481 by Queen Joan II and in Aragón in 1494 by King Ferdinand the Catholic.

Foreign affairs council (1522–1834)

King Charles I inherited vast territories through Europe and decided to create a new council called «of State» due to the enormous foreign policy that marked his reign. This council started its duties in 1526 when Sultan Suleiman the Magnificent threatened Spanish possessions in Austria.

It was the only Council that did not have a president, because it was the King himself who assumed that function. His advisors were not specialists in laws but experts in international relations, such as the Duke of Alba or Nicolás Perrenot. The councilors were, therefore, members of the high nobility and the high clergy. In times of Philip II sometimes the monarch did not preside over the councils and, in his place, sent to its secretary Antonio Perez.

It had a great influence during the reigns of Charles I and Philip II and later during the regency of Mariana of Austria (1665–1675). The reforms of Philip V (1700–1746) emptied its actual power, although Manuel de Godoy wished to revive it in 1792.

Unlike the Council of Castile, in which the King listened to the councilors and executed the conclusions presented to him, in the Council of State was the King himself who exposed the points to be discussed, listened to his advisors and, subsequently, the same monarch made the decisions that were to be made.

Supreme consultative council of the Government (1812–today)
The Council of State has existed intermittently during 19th and 20th centuries. The Constitution of 1812 granted the King the executive power and established that this was the only council to which the King could go to ask for advice. This obligation was over in 1814 when King Ferdinand VII restored absolutism. The Constitution configured the council as a King-control-body forcing the King to take to the council important issues like the sanction of the laws, the declaration of war or the conclusion of treaties that in any case the sovereign could undertake without having previously "heard" the council.

With the death of the King in 1833, the year later the council was abolished and the Royal Council of Spain and the Indies was created instead as a superior consultative body but was abolished in 1836. In 1845, under the name of Royal Council the body was restored and for the first time the Presidency of the council was granted to the Prime Minister. In 1858 the original name recovered and since then the council has been regulated by numerous laws, the latest in 1980.

Nowadays the Council of State continues being the main and superior consultative body of the Government, but since 1991 some economic and social competencies have been transferred to the Economic and Social Council.

Current organization
The Council of State has its headquarters in the Palace of the Councils, Madrid. (LOCE § 1.3) The Council of State Organic Act establish that the council will watch for the observance of the Constitution and the rest of the legal order when the Government ask for its advice or when the laws establish it (LOCE § 2.1).

The council is formed by its president that is appointed by the Council of Ministers with the advice of the Prime Minister after appearing before Congress and three kind of Councilors:

 The Permanent Councilors.
 To be elected Permanent Councilor you must have previously been Minister, President or minister of a regional government, Councilor of State, member of the Advisory Councils of the regional governments, Chief Law Clerk of the Council of State, Academic of number of the Royal Academies integrated into the Institute of Spain, Full professor of law, economic or social disciplines in the university, with fifteen years of experience, General Officer of the Legal Bodies of the Armed Forces, State civil servants with fifteen years of service at least in bodies or scales for which admission is required university degree or former Governors of the Bank of Spain.
 The Born Councilors.
 To be elected Born Councilor you must have previously been Prime Minister, director of the Royal Academies, President of the Economic and Social Council, Attorney General, Chief of the Defence Staff, President of the General Council of Lawyers, President of the Ministry of Justice' General Codification Committee, Solicitor General, Director of the Center for Political and Constitutional Studies or Governor of the Bank of Spain.
 The Elective Councilors.
 To be elected Elective Councilor you must have previously been Member of Parliament, Magistrate of the Constitutional Court, Judge or Advocate General of the Court of Justice of the European Union, Ombudsman, President or Member of the General Council of the Judiciary, Minister or Secretary of State, President of the Court of Auditors, Chief of the Defense Staff, President or Minister of a Regional Government, Ambassador from the diplomatic career, Mayor of a provincial capital, President of the Provincial Council, of the Inter-Island Commonwealth, of the Island Council or of the Insular Council or University Rector.

See also
 Economic and Social Council of Spain

References

External links
 Website of the Council of State 

Spanish monarchy
Privy councils